Liborius Ritter von Frank (5 October 1848 — 26 February 1935)  was an  Austro-Hungarian general in World War I. He commanded the Austro-Hungarian Fifth Army in 1914 at the start of the war, and fought at the Battle of Cer, Battle of Drina and Battle of Kolubara. He was replaced by General Karl Tersztyánszky von Nádas after the failure of the first Serbian Campaign, the enormous casualties suffered by his army reduced to about 40% of its strength and the disbandment of the Balkanstreitkräfte.

References

External links
 Biography of Liborius Ritter von Frank

Austro-Hungarian military personnel of World War I
Austrian knights
1848 births
1935 deaths
Austro-Hungarian generals